The 2022 Texas Bowl was a college football bowl game played on December 28, 2022, at NRG Stadium in Houston, Texas. The 16th annual Texas Bowl, the game featured Texas Tech from the Big 12 Conference and Ole Miss from the Southeastern Conference (SEC). The game began at 8:09p.m. CST and was aired on ESPN. It was one of the 2022–23 bowl games concluding the 2022 FBS football season. Sponsored by tax preparation software company TaxAct, the game was officially known as the TaxAct Texas Bowl.

Teams
Consistent with conference tie-ins, the game featured teams from the Big 12 Conference and the Southeastern Conference (SEC).

This was the seventh meeting between Texas Tech and Ole Miss, with their most recent prior meeting coming in 2018. Coming into the bowl, the Rebels led the all-time series 4–2. This was the fourth bowl game played between the two teams—they met in the 1986 Independence Bowl, 1998 Independence Bowl, and 2009 Cotton Bowl Classic; all three match-ups ended in a victory for Ole Miss.

Texas Tech

Texas Tech, from the Big 12, finished the regular season with a record of 7–5, led by first-year head coach Joey McGuire. Highlights of the season included finishing with a winning conference record (5–4) for the first time since 2009 and defeating Texas and Oklahoma in the same season for the first time in program history. This was the Red Raiders' third Texas Bowl appearance, having won the 2012 edition, 34–31, to Minnesota and losing the 2015 edition, 27–56, to LSU.  Texas Tech began the game in air raid formation as a tribute to former head coach Mike Leach.

Ole Miss

Ole Miss, from the SEC, finished the regular season with a record of 8–4, led by third-year head coach Lane Kiffin. The team started the season 7–0, but lost four of their next five games. This was the Rebels' first Texas Bowl appearance.

Game summary

Statistics

References

Texas Bowl
Texas Bowl
Texas Bowl
Texas Bowl
Texas Tech Red Raiders football bowl games
Ole Miss Rebels football bowl games